is a train station located in Kurume, Fukuoka, Japan. The largest station of Kurume. Nishitetsu Kurume bus terminal is on the first floor.

Lines 

Nishi-Nippon Railroad
Tenjin Ōmuta Line
Amagi Line

Platforms

References

Railway stations in Fukuoka Prefecture
Railway stations in Japan opened in 1924